Jacques Cotot (born 11 August 1940) is a French boxer. He competed at the 1960 Summer Olympics and the 1964 Summer Olympics. At the 1960 Summer Olympics, he lost by decision to Ferenc Kellner of Hungary in the Round of 32 after receiving a bye in the round of 64.

References

External links
 

1940 births
Living people
French male boxers
Olympic boxers of France
Boxers at the 1960 Summer Olympics
Boxers at the 1964 Summer Olympics
Sportspeople from Saône-et-Loire
Lightweight boxers